The 1966 NCAA College Division football season was the 11th season of college football in the United States organized by the National Collegiate Athletic Association at the NCAA College Division level.

Conference standings

Rankings

College Division teams (also referred to as "small college") were ranked in polls by the AP (a panel of writers) and by UPI (coaches). The national champion(s) for each season were determined by the final poll rankings, published at or near the end of the regular season, before any bowl games were played.

College Division final polls
In 1966, both services ranked San Diego State (10–0) at the top, with Montana State (8–2) ranked second by UPI and third by the AP, led by quarterbacks Don Horn and Dennis Erickson, respectively. They later met in the Camellia Bowl in Sacramento, California, with San Diego State prevailing, 28–7.

United Press International (coaches) final poll
Published on November 30

Associated Press (writers) final poll
Published on December 1

Bowl games
The postseason consisted of four bowls as regional finals, played on December 10.

See also
 1966 NCAA University Division football season
 1966 NAIA football season

References